Rusko is a municipality in Finland.

Rusko may also refer to:

Places 
Rusko, Środa Śląska County in Lower Silesian Voivodeship (south-west Poland)
Rusko, Świdnica County in Lower Silesian Voivodeship (south-west Poland)
Rusko, Greater Poland Voivodeship (west-central Poland)
Rusko, West Pomeranian Voivodeship (north-west Poland)
 Rusko, a neighborhood in Oulu, Finland
 Rusko, an industrial park in Tampere, Finland

Other uses 
Rusko (musician), a Leeds-born dubstep artist
Pavol Rusko, a Slovak politician
Czech and Slovak word for Russia